Colyton Colts Rugby League Football Club is an Australian rugby league football club based in Colyton, New South Wales formed in 1968.

Notable Juniors 
David Liddiard (1983-1992 Parramatta Eels, Penrith Panthers & Manly Sea Eagles)
Tony Butterfield (1986-2000 Penrith Panthers & Newcastle Knights)
Darren South (1989-1991 St. George Dragons)
Glen Liddiard (1988-1995 Penrith Panthers, Parramatta, North Sydney & South Qld)
Scott Ellem (1990-1991 Penrith Panthers)
David Seidenkamp (1990-1995 Canterbury Bulldogs, Easts & Wests Magpies)
Steven Burns (1991-1992 Wests Magpies)
Reece Webb (1991-1993 Wests Magpies)
Craig Gower (1996-2013 Penrith Panthers, London Broncos & Newcastle Knights)
Fred Petersen (1996-2003 Penrith Panthers & Sydney Roosters)
Troy Wozniak (1999-2004 Balmain Tigers, Parramatta Eels, Widnes Vikings & West Tigers)
Scott Mclean (2001-2002 Northern Eagles & South Sydney Rabbitohs)
Craig Trindall (2006 Penrith Panthers)
Brent McConnell (2006 North Queensland Cowboys)
Tepai Moeroa (2014- Parramatta Eels)

See also

List of rugby league clubs in Australia
Rugby league in New South Wales

References

External links
Colyton Colts RLFC Fox Sports pulse

Rugby league teams in Sydney
Rugby clubs established in 1968
1968 establishments in Australia